Saribia perroti is a butterfly in the family Riodinidae. It is found on Madagascar. The habitat consists of forests.

References

Butterflies described in 1932
Nemeobiinae